The 2009 BDO Canadian Open of Curling was held January 22-25 at the MTS Centre in Winnipeg, Manitoba.

Preliminary round Standings

Pool A

Pool B

Pool C

Playoffs

External links
World Curling Tour page

2009
2009 in Canadian curling
2009 in Manitoba
Curling competitions in Winnipeg